Steve Molitor (born April 4, 1980) is a Canadian former professional boxer who competed from 2000 to 2012 and held the IBF super-bantamweight title twice between 2006 and 2011.

Career history 
Born in Sarnia, Ontario, Molitor began boxing at the age of nine, following in the footsteps of his brother, former commonwealth champion Jeremy Molitor. He won five national titles at 112 pounds. He participated in the Olympic trials but lost a decision to Mike Messel. His final amateur record was 93 wins and eleven losses.

Molitor became a professional boxer on May 18, 2000, with an eight-round decision over Julio Luna. In 2002 he scored his most notable win to date when he beat former Olympian Scotty Olson for the Canadian super bantamweight title. Later that year he beat Englishman Nicky Booth for the Commonwealth bantamweight championship. On April 21, 2004, Molitor defeated Hugo Dianzo for the vacated NABA North American title, by a unanimous decision.

On November 10, 2006, he knocked out Michael Hunter in the fifth round for the vacant IBF super bantamweight championship title. On July 14, 2007, Molitor dismantled South Africa's Takalani Ndlovu in his first title defense, by scoring a 9th round TKO at Casino Rama in Rama, Ontario.  He also defeated Thailand's Fahsan 3K Battery by unanimous decision on October 27 in his second defense, also at Casino Rama. On January 19, 2008 Molitor defended his title against Ricardo Castillo, with a unanimous decision victory.

On April 5, 2008, Molitor again defended his title defeating Fernando Beltran in a twelve round unanimous decision, running his record to 27–0. The fight took place at Casino Rama.

In the early summer of 2008, Molitor parted ways with his trainer Chris Johnson and replaced him by Stéphan Larouche. On August 29 Molitor defended his title against the then unbeaten Ceferino Labarda. He won the match by TKO. The fight took place at Casino Rama.

On November 21, 2008, Molitor lost in his attempt to unify his IBF super bantamweight title with the WBA title against Celestino Caballero of Panama, the current defending WBA champion.  Caballero won the fight in the fourth round by TKO at the Casino Rama, Ontario.

Molitor next fought Heriberto Ruiz on June 26, 2009, again at Casino Rama. Molitor won the fight on a split decision.

Molitor reunited with Chris Johnson before his 5th round knockout win against Feliciano Ledezma on September 4, 2009 at Casino Rama.

On November 21, 2009, Molitor beat Jose Saez in 8 rounds via a unanimous decision.

On March 27, 2010, Molitor regained the IBF Junior Featherweight championship, again defeating Takalani Ndlovu in 12 rounds by unanimous decision.

On March 26, 2011, in his third bout against Ndlovu, Molitor lost his title via unanimous decision. The judges' scores were 118-110, 116-112, and 118-110.

On September 22, 2012, Molitor challenged for the IBF Inter-Continental Super-Bantamweight title in Belfast against Carl Frampton in front of Frampton's home town crowd in the city's Odyssey Arena. Frampton scored an impressive sixth-round TKO and had Molitor on the canvas three times during the one-sided bout.

Professional boxing record

References

External links 
 
 Chris Johnson's Fighting Alliance – Molitor's Boxing Club
 
 Official Site

1980 births
Boxers at the 1999 Pan American Games
Boxing people from Ontario
International Boxing Federation champions
Living people
Pan American Games competitors for Canada
Southpaw boxers
Sportspeople from Sarnia
Super-bantamweight boxers
Canadian male boxers